The Karelian National Battalion (Karelian: Karjalan Kansallini Pataljona) is a voluntary military unit consisting of ethnic Karelians, functioning as part of the International Legion of Territorial Defence of Ukraine. It was formed in January 2023 by active members of the Karelian National Movement, announcing the creation of the battalion bearing the name "Vaseli Levonen" with the goals to achieve the liberation of Karelia from "Russian occupation" and the independence of the region.

History

Formation
The formation of the unit occurred in late January 2023 by representative members of the Karelian National Movement, announcing the creation of the Karelian Unit within the Ukrainian Armed Forces as part of the International Legion of Territorial Defence of Ukraine. Activists claim that the intention of the battalion is to afight against the Russian invaders in Ukraine and eventually achieve the liberation of Karelia from "Russian occupation" and the full independence of the region.

The first post of the newly created battalion's Telegram channel "KNB - Karelian National Battalion" gave a message stating: "We stand for the unity and unity of all passionate national units in our desire and aspiration to throw off forever the colonial imperial fetters which squeeze the will of the peoples enslaved by Moscow.". Within the same post, it further outlined that their goal is "to win freedom for our Motherland!".

The battalion bears the name "Ukki Väinämöinen", also known as Vaseli Levonen, which is shown on the battalion's distinct insignia. Vaseli Levonen was a Karelian ideological leader known for his role in the East Karelian uprising against the Soviet Union in the years 1921-1922.

Recruitment
According to the battalion's Telegram channel, the unit appeals to all activists of the Karelian National Movement, indigenous peoples of Karelia, as well as to all those who wish to contribute to the cause of "Freedom and Independence" of Karelia. It further outlines that volunteers are being recruited to fight for "Freedom against the imperialist yoke", as well as the requirements for joining the unit which consists of volunteers being: in good health, having no problems with alcohol or drugs, having a commitment to traditional Nordic values, a fierce desire to free Karelia from occupation, and finally a strong desire to contribute to be victorious over Putin's "terrorist regime".

Russo-Ukrainian War
In a Telegram post by the battalion on 18 February 2023, stated that the Karelian National Movement announced a fundraiser for the battalion. It outlined the fact that "fighters are waiting for dispatch to the front", further detailing that the "shipment is delayed and they are all now in a foreign country in a difficult financial situation". The unit also claims that their fighters "become the people who create the new Karelian Army.".

Extremism

Members
Similar to other Ukrainian units, this unit has seen some presence of controversy surrounding the recruitment of fighters from far-right groups. A YouTube video posted on the Karelian National Battalion's Telegram Channel states that a battalion of supporters of the separation of Karelia from Russia has been created in Ukraine, propagandizing the ideology of Nazism. The video further claims that affiliated movements of the battalion spread information that can be linked to Neo-Nazism such as race theory, and plans for countries submerged under Nazi rule.

On 25 February 2023, the battalion's official Telegram channel uploaded a photo of supposedly two of the Karelian fighters holding a flag of the infamous Azov Battalion, with the caption "Our fighters". In the photo it is visible to see the insignia used by the Azov Battalion in 2014-2015, representing the Wolfsangel symbol which is also utilised by the battalion's chevron itself.

Propaganda
The battalion's Telegram channel displays a range of propaganda and footage of the Winter War against the Soviet Union between 1939-1940. Posts can be seen of Finnish soldiers, most probably during the Continuation War, saluting a Karelian flag accompanied by a Finnish one. Such captions discuss the Karelian race fighting for its "freedom and for home".

It has also been reported by several news outlets that the battalion recalls that during the Winter War between the Soviet Union and Finland, Ukrainian units defended the territory of Karelia on the side of the Armed Forces of Finland while being commanded by the former Holnodyarsk chieftain, lieutenant colonel of the Ukrainian People's Army, Yuriy Gorlis-Gorsky.

See also 
 Russian Volunteer Corps - Ukrainian volunteer unit consisting of ethnic Russians
 Separatism in Russia - Separatism within Russian states
 Denys Prokopenko - Former leader of the Azov Regiment, has been seen wearing Karelian insignia due to his heritage

References

External links 
 Official Telegram channel of the Karelian National Battalion
 Official Telegram channel of the Karelian National Movement

Karelia
Regiments of the International Legion of Territorial Defense of Ukraine
Foreign volunteer units resisting the 2022 Russian invasion of Ukraine
Military units and formations established in 2023
Territorial defence battalions of Ukraine
Resistance during the 2022 Russian invasion of Ukraine
Military units and formations of the 2022 Russian invasion of Ukraine